Koxie or Kokhie is a mountain village near Ain Sifni in southern Kurdistan (north of Iraq). It has been bombed and destroyed by the previous Iraqi regimes.

Former populated places in Iraq